Wizards of Waverly Place: The Movie is a 2009 American made-for-television comedy-drama fantasy film based on the Disney Channel Original Series Wizards of Waverly Place. It was directed by Lev L. Spiro and filmed primarily in San Juan, Puerto Rico in February and March 2009. The full cast of the series starred in the film, although Jennifer Stone only had a small role at the beginning of the film. The film focuses on Alex Russo having to reverse a wish she made that her parents never met after being grounded during a trip to the Caribbean.

The film premiered on August 28, 2009, on the Disney Channel in the United States. It received 11.4 million viewers at its premiere, making it the second-most-viewed Disney Channel Original Movie premiere at that time, after High School Musical 2. It was also cable's No. 1 scripted telecast of 2009 in total viewers. It premiered in the UK and Ireland on October 23, 2009, as part of Wiz-Tober 2009. It was released on DVD on December 15, 2009, as an Extended Edition. The film won the 2010 Primetime Emmy Award for Outstanding Children's Program.

Plot 
Jerry and Theresa Russo and their three children, Justin, Alex, and Max, are preparing for a magic-free vacation to the Caribbean, home to some of the most important magical wizard spots in the world. There, the family visits a street fair, where they encounter  street magician and former wizard Archie who tries to enlist their help in turning Giselle, a parrot, back into a human by finding the Stone of Dreams, which has the power to grant any wish or reverse any spell. Jerry considers the idea too dangerous, as many wizards have gone on the quest and never returned.

Later, Alex is caught trying to use magic to get away from her family by her mother, leading to an argument which results in her mother grounding her for two months and taking away her magic privileges. In a fit of rage, Alex wishes that her parents had never met. A smuggled wand and spell book, which Alex was holding at the time, grant her wish and as a result creates an alternate reality where Jerry and Theresa do not remember their kids and do not know each other.

The kids attempt to get the spell book from Jerry, but he catches them. In this alternate reality, since he never met and married Theresa, he still has his powers and is shown to have a care-free-like attitude. Justin asks him what would happen if a wizard wished that his or her parents never met; Jerry explains they would gradually forget their past before disappearing forever. He further says they only have 48 hours to reverse the spell, causing Alex and Justin to panic, and that it would take a miracle to fix it, leading Justin to mention the Stone of Dreams, which Jerry says would also work too and he jokingly tells them they should go and find it.

Justin and Alex set off to find the Stone of Dreams, guided by Archie. Meanwhile, Max stays at the resort to watch their parents; being the youngest child, Max begins losing his memory. Realizing that something is wrong, Max tells Jerry that Alex and Justin have gone to find the Stone of Dreams, having taken his suggestion seriously, and asks him to help him find them. Jerry is shocked by this, knowing how incredibly dangerous the journey is, but agrees to help. They are joined by Theresa, who believes them to simply be treasure hunting.

Eventually, Alex and Justin succeed in finding the Stone of Dreams, but Giselle steals the Stone. Theresa, Max and Jerry meet up with them and the kids tell Theresa and Jerry their story. Theresa doesn't believe them, believing she would not forget her children. Jerry mentions that if one of the kids was a full wizard, they might be able to cast a spell to reverse it. Max finally loses all of his memories and is sucked into a vortex of non-existence. Theresa remembers him at the last minute, realizing that they were telling the truth. Jerry transports Alex and Justin to an ancient battlefield to have a contest. He explains the contest's rules: they will only be allowed to use spells involving the four classic elements, and the winner will become a full wizard, while the loser will permanently lose their powers. Alex and Justin engage in what turns out to be an intense battle, with Alex narrowly winning it. In a state of worry, Alex turns to Justin for help. However, by now Justin has lost all of his memories; Alex tells him that even though they pick on each other, she looks up to him and begs Justin to not leave her alone. Justin tells her that he'd never leave her and that even though he doesn't know her, he believes her and wants to help, but he is quickly sucked into the vortex.

Meanwhile, Theresa returns to the resort and notices Giselle in human form with the Stone of Dreams on her necklace. After Giselle admits to using him to get the Stone, Archie manages to take the Stone from her. He uses it to turn her back into a parrot before giving it to Theresa. Back at the battlefield, Alex becomes desperate, realizing Justin should have won, as he is a smarter and more skilled wizard. She tries to do a spell and begs Jerry for help, but he says it’s too late. Just as Alex begins to become hopeless, Theresa appears with the Stone, having used it to transport herself to the battlefield to help Alex. Jerry tells her she can wish for her brothers to reappear and still keep her full wizard powers if she uses her one wish correctly, but Alex wishes for everything to go back to the way it was. The alternate reality is erased as time rewinds to just before the argument that preceded Alex making the wish that her parents did not meet. This time, Alex apologizes for her attitude and gracefully accepts her grounding. She lovingly reunites with Justin and Max, who have full memories of their adventure, and they and their parents stroll once more.

Cast

 Selena Gomez as Alex Russo, the selfish and rebellious middle child of the Russo family who does not want to go on vacation with her family to the Caribbean; casts a spell wishing her parents never met after being grounded by Theresa, and has to fix her mistake before time erases the Russo siblings and Alex herself.
 David Henrie as Justin Russo, Alex and Max's responsible and uptight older brother who has the family wand and Book of Forbidden Spells in his possession.
 Jake T. Austin as Max Russo, Alex and Justin's absentminded and crazy younger brother.
 Jennifer Stone as Harper Finkle, Alex's best friend, a mortal, whom she wants to stay with while her family goes on vacation.
 Maria Canals-Barrera as Theresa Russo, Alex, Justin, and Max's mother who has declared the family vacation magic free; grounds Alex, causing her to cast a spell wishing that she (Theresa) and Jerry had never met, which subsequently causes her to forget her past and children.
 Steve Valentine as Archie, a former wizard turned horrible magician who wants to get the Stone of Dreams in order to change his girlfriend, Giselle, back to human form to the extent of even stealing the Stone of Dreams from Alex and Justin, who are battling against time to save their family.
 Xavier Enrique Torres as Javier, an attractive activities counselor at the resort where the Russo family is staying whom Alex has a crush on.
 Jennifer Alden as Giselle, Archie's girlfriend who was turned into a parrot.
 David DeLuise as Jerry Russo, Alex, Justin, and Max's father who is a former family wizard who gave up his powers in order to marry Theresa; original owner of the Russo family Book of Forbidden Spells and family wand, entrusts this wand with Justin.

Production

Casting
The full cast of the Disney Channel Original Series Wizards of Waverly Place appeared in the film. However, Jennifer Stone as Harper Finkle only made an appearance at the beginning of the film, and did not star.

Filming
Wizards of Waverly Place: The Movie was filmed primarily in San Juan, Puerto Rico between February and March 2009, the second Disney Channel Original Movie filmed in Puerto Rico after Princess Protection Program, also starring Selena Gomez. Hotel scenes were shot at the Caribe Hilton Hotel in San Juan, while the main cave scene, where Alex, Justin and Archie are climbing inside the cave, was shot inside Cueva Ventana in Arecibo as well as a land that sits in the Río Grande de Arecibo valley in front of the mountain where the cave resides in which Alex asks for directions to the cave. The ancient battlefield where Alex and Justin compete to be the family wizard takes place at the Castillo San Felipe del Morro in the Old San Juan. The subway scene where the train from the platform is shown was shot in Toronto, despite the series being based in New York City.

Promotion
Selena Gomez recorded a "Magic" cover for the film that is featured on the soundtrack for the film and television show. A sneak peek of the film aired during the conclusion of the four-part "Wizards vs. Vampires" event on Disney Channel on August 8, 2009, and on Family Channel during the week of August 24, 2009. The What's What Edition of the film premiered on October 24, 2009, on Disney Channel.

Release
The film premiered on Disney Channel as a Disney Channel Original Movie on August 28, 2009. The film premiered in the UK and Ireland on October 23, 2009, as part of Wiz-Tober 2009. The film premiered in Spain on October 11, 2009, as part of Magoctubre 2009 in Spain.

Ratings
The film garnered 11.4 million viewers on its premiere night, making it cable's No. 1 scripted telecast of 2009 and Disney Channel's second-most-viewed film premiere after High School Musical 2. On its second night, the film's second showing received 5.8 million viewers. The next day, the film's third showing got 4.3 million viewers, and its fourth showing received 4.7 million viewers.
When the film premiered in the UK, as part of Wiz-tober, the film received 1.0 million viewers, which made it the 7th-most-watched program on multi-channel viewing for that week, and the second-highest views watched on Disney Channel UK.

What's What Edition
The "What's What Edition" of the film premiered on October 24, 2009, on Disney Channel, part of a Wizards of Waverly Place marathon. The "What's What Edition" featured exclusive behind-the-scenes information on the film during the presentation.

Soundtrack

In an interview with Disney Channel's commercial-segment, Disney 365, Selena Gomez discussed her interpretations of the songs on the soundtrack saying: "'Disappear' is more of a romantic song. It's basically talking about how a girl likes a guy and they [she] don't want him to disappear, and then 'Magical' is about casting a spell on a guy and this song, 'Magic', ties into Wizards of Waverly Place: The Movie". Although recorded for an episode, "Make it Happen" doesn't appear on the album, for an unknown reason. The album includes songs from and inspired by the TV series and Wizards of Waverly Place: The Movie.
"Magic" by Selena Gomez is a digital single on the iTunes Store. The song was released on July 21, 2009, as part of the Radio Disney iTunes Pass. "Magic" premiered on Radio Disney and a music video to Disney Channel on July 24. The song's music video has Gomez singing into a microphone with bright and flamboyant background, as well as including clips from Wizards of Waverly Place: The Movie. "Magic" debuted at no. 61 in the Billboard Hot 100 with 42,000 downloads.

Home media
The film was released on DVD in the United States and Canada on December 15, 2009, as an "Extended Edition", which also came with a replica of the Stone of Dreams in a necklace. The film is in English, French and Spanish, and has subtitles in the same languages. The film was also released on DVD in Australia on December 15, 2009, in Germany and France on December 2, 2009, and in the United Kingdom on February 22, 2010.

Awards and nominations

Marketing
The film's first teaser trailer was released on Disney Channel on June 17, 2009. The full-length trailer was released on June 26, 2009, during the premiere of Selena Gomez's other Disney Channel Original Movie, Princess Protection Program.

Proposed sequel
In June 2010, production of a second film was announced. Dan Berendsen was to return as script writer for the film. Since that announcement, no other updates were made about the sequel. On April 25, 2011, Selena Gomez confirmed in an interview that the proposed sequel would not be filmed. However, on July 28, 2011, Maria Canals-Barrera stated in an interview that the project was "not 100% dead anymore" and that she was "hopeful" that a second film would be produced.
Later, it was confirmed that the "Wizards" would return in a special event entitled The Wizards Return: Alex vs. Alex in early 2013.

See also
 List of Wizards of Waverly Place episodes
 List of Disney Channel original films
 List of Disney Channel series

References

External links

 
 

2009 television films
2009 films
2000s adventure comedy films
2000s fantasy comedy films
2000s teen comedy films
American teen comedy films
Films about wish fulfillment
Films about parallel universes
Films set in New York City
Films set in the Caribbean
American alternate history films
American adventure comedy films
American fantasy comedy films
Disney Channel Original Movie films
Films based on television series
Films shot in Puerto Rico
Wizards of Waverly Place
Films about wizards
Treasure hunt films
Films about vacationing
Television films based on television series
Hispanic and Latino American comedy films
Films directed by Lev L. Spiro
2000s English-language films
2000s American films